Kasagi Dam is an earthfill dam located in Fukuoka Prefecture in Japan. The dam is used for irrigation. The catchment area of the dam is 0.6 km2. The dam can store 399 thousand cubic meters of water. The construction of the dam was completed in 1957.

References

Dams in Fukuoka Prefecture
1957 establishments in Japan